The 1938–39 1re série season was the 23rd season of the 1re série, the top level of ice hockey in France. Chamonix Hockey Club won their eighth championship.

Final ranking
 1st place: Chamonix Hockey Club
 2nd place: Français Volants

External links
List of French champions on hockeyarchives.info

Fra
1938–39 in French ice hockey
Ligue Magnus seasons